The 1976 Chowchilla kidnapping was the abduction of a school bus driver and 26 children, ages 5 to 14, in Chowchilla, California, United States, on July 15, 1976. The kidnappers held their captives in a box truck buried in a quarry in Livermore, California, intending to demand a ransom for their return. After about 16 hours underground, the driver and children dug themselves out and escaped, all surviving. The quarry owner's son and two of his friends were convicted of the crime, each receiving a sentence of life with the possibility of parole. By 2022, all three had been paroled.

Kidnapping 
At around 4 p.m. PDT on Thursday, July 15, 1976, school bus driver Frank Edward "Ed" Ray was driving 26 students of Dairyland Elementary School home from a summer class trip to the Chowchilla Fairgrounds swimming pool when a van blocked the road ahead of the bus. Ray stopped the bus and was confronted by three armed men with nylon stockings covering their faces. One of the men held a gun to Ray while another drove the bus; the third man followed in the van.

The kidnappers hid the bus in the Berenda Slough, a shallow branch of the Chowchilla River, where a second van had been parked. Both vans' back windows were painted black; their interiors were reinforced with paneling. Ray and the children were forced into the two vans at gunpoint and then driven around for 11 hours before being taken to a quarry in Livermore. There, in the early morning of July 16, the kidnappers forced the victims to climb down a ladder into a buried moving truck that they had stocked with a small amount of food and water and some mattresses.

Ray and the older children later stacked the mattresses so that some of them could reach the opening at the top of the truck, which had been covered with a heavy sheet of metal and weighed down with two  industrial batteries. After hours of effort, Ray and the oldest boy, 14-year-old Michael Marshall, wedged the lid open with a piece of wood and moved the batteries; they then dug away the remainder of the debris blocking the entrance. Sixteen hours after they had entered the truck, the group emerged and walked to the quarry's guard shack, near Shadow Cliffs Regional Park.

Arrests and convictions

The quarry owner's son, 24-year-old Frederick Newhall Woods IV, quickly came under suspicion as one of the people who had keys to the quarry and enough access to have buried the moving truck there. He and two of his friends, brothers James and Richard Schoenfeld (aged 24 and 22 respectively), had previously been convicted of motor vehicle theft, for which they had been sentenced to probation. A warrant was executed on the estate of Woods' father, and there police recovered one of the guns used in the kidnapping as well as a draft of a ransom note, but the three men had fled. Woods was caught two weeks after the kidnapping in Vancouver, British Columbia, Canada. James Schoenfeld had been captured earlier the same day in Menlo Park, California, while Richard Schoenfeld had voluntarily turned himself in to authorities eight days after the kidnapping.

The kidnappers had been unable to call in their intended ransom demand of $5 million (equivalent to $ million in ) because telephone lines to the Chowchilla Police Department were tied up by media calls and families searching for their children. They went to sleep at some point on July 16 and woke late that night to television news reports informing them that the victims had freed themselves and were safe.

James Schoenfeld later stated that despite coming from wealthy families, both he and Woods were deeply in debt: "We needed multiple victims to get multiple millions, and we picked children because children are precious. The state would be willing to pay ransom for them. And they don't fight back. They're vulnerable. They will mind."

All three perpetrators pleaded guilty to kidnapping for ransom and robbery, but they refused to plead guilty to infliction of bodily harm, as a conviction on that count in conjunction with the kidnapping charge carried a mandatory sentence of life in prison without the possibility of parole. They were tried on the bodily harm charge, found guilty and given the mandatory sentence, but their convictions were overturned by an appellate court which found that physical injuries sustained by the children (mostly cuts and bruises) did not meet the standard for bodily harm under the law. They were re-sentenced to life with the possibility of parole. Richard Schoenfeld was released in 2012, and James Schoenfeld was paroled on August 7, 2015.

In October 2019, Woods was denied parole for the 19th time. Over the years, reasons given for the denials have included his continued minimization of his crime as well as disciplinary infractions for possession of contraband pornography and cellphones.

In 2016, a worker's compensation lawsuit filed against Woods also revealed that he had been running several businesses, including a gold mine and a car dealership, from behind bars without notifying prison authorities as required. The heir to two wealthy California families, the Newhalls and the Woodses, he inherited a trust fund from his parents that was described in one court filing as being worth $100 million (equivalent to $ million in ), although Woods' lawyer disputed that amount. He has married three times while in prison and has purchased a mansion about 30 minutes away from the prison.

In March 2022, a panel of two commissioners recommended Woods for parole. The recommendation required the approval of the full parole board, the board's legal division, and California's governor. California Governor Gavin Newsom asked the parole board to reconsider its decision but the decision was affirmed. On August 17, 2022, it was reported that Woods' parole had been granted and he was to be released from prison.

Aftermath

Frank Edward "Ed" Ray (February 26, 1921 – May 17, 2012) received a California School Employees Association citation for outstanding community service. Before he died in 2012, he was visited by many of the schoolchildren he had helped save. In 2015, the Sports & Leisure Park in Chowchilla was renamed the Edward Ray Park, and every February 26 was declared "Edward Ray Day" in Chowchilla.

A study found that the kidnapped children suffered from panic attacks, nightmares involving kidnappings and death, and personality changes. Many developed fears of such things as "cars, the dark, the wind, the kitchen, mice, dogs and hippies", and one shot a Japanese tourist with a BB gun when the tourist's car broke down in front of his home. Many of the children continued to report symptoms of trauma at least 25 years after the kidnapping, including substance abuse and depression, and a number have been imprisoned for "doing something controlling to somebody else." What was learned from the after-effects suffered by the kidnapped children has guided the treatment of young victims of trauma since the kidnapping.

In 2016, the 25 surviving kidnapped children settled a lawsuit they had filed against their kidnappers. The money they received was paid out of Frederick Woods' trust fund, and although the exact settlement amount was not disclosed, one survivor stated that they had each received "enough to pay for some serious therapy — but not enough for a house."

Abductors

 Frederick Newhall Woods IV (aged 24 during the kidnapping) was repeatedly denied parole until August 2022 when, at the age of 70, he was granted full parole.
 James Schoenfeld (aged 24 during the kidnapping) was paroled in 2015 at age 63.
 Richard Schoenfeld (aged 22 during the kidnapping) was paroled in 2012 at age 57.

In popular culture

A two-hour made-for-television movie about the event aired on the ABC Network on March 1, 1993 titled, They've Taken Our Children: The Chowchilla Kidnapping. It starred Karl Malden as bus driver Ed Ray, and Julie Harris as his wife.

The Chowchilla kidnappings were featured on episode 7 of season 2 of the program House of Horrors: Kidnapped, which airs on the American cable network Investigation Discovery. The episode, "Buried Alive", first aired on April 21, 2015, and was told from the point of view of Michael Marshall, who at age 14 was the oldest of the children on the bus.

Also in 2015, an episode of Inside Edition reunited some of the kidnapped women to tell their stories of the kidnappings. The bus from the kidnappings, which is now stored in a Chowchilla farm warehouse, was also seen in the episode.

In 2019, the television news magazine 48 Hours investigated the story in the episode "Live to Tell: The Chowchilla Kidnapping".

See also 

 1972 Faraday School kidnapping
 2013 Alabama bunker hostage crisis

References

External links
 "'Nobody's Gonna Talk': The ballad of the Chowchilla bus kidnapping", Vox, July 23, 2021.

1976 crimes in the United States
1976 in California
Chowchilla, California
Crimes in the San Francisco Bay Area
Formerly missing people
July 1976 events in the United States
Kidnapped American children
Kidnappings in the United States